Chandsar is a small village in the district of  Aravalli district in the state of Gujarat, India.

Geography
It has an average elevation of 73 metres (239 feet).

Chandsar is separated from other villages by the main river on one side and by its tributary on two other sides, and is subject to floods. There are a few hundred residents, primarily farmers, and about fifty families. The temple of Mahakali Mata in the middle of the village, near a pond. The village has a fair weather connection with the main road. There is no bridge over the river.

There is a school that goes up to the 4 standard stage. A neighboring village has a medical dispensary and the local post office.

Demographics
 India census, Chandsar had a population of 300. Males constitute 50.22% of the population and females 49.78%. Chandsar has an average literacy rate of 65%, higher than the national average of 59.5%: male literacy is 73% and, female literacy is 58%. In Chandsar, 14% of the population is under 6 years of age.

It is situated in the district of Arvalli Gujarat, 20 km from Bayad, 15 km from Malpur, 24 km from Modasa and 14 km from Virpur. The village receives abundant water for irrigation from a canal of the Vatrak River.

References
 1 to 4 primary school  The school was established in 1954 and it is managed by the Local Body. It is located in rural area . It is located in MALPUR block of SABAR KANTHA district of GUJARAT. The school consists of Grades from 1 to 5. The school is co-educational and it does not have an attached pre-primary section. The school is non-residential in nature and is not using school building as a shift-school. During the previous academic year, the school functioned for 220 days. It had 1 academic inspection and was 7 times visited by the CRC Coordinator during the previous academic year. It was not visited by the BRC Coordinator.   Gujarati is the medium of instructions in this school. This school is approachable by all-weather road. In this school academic session starts in June.

Aravalli district